PRR G3 was an American Pennsylvania Railroad (PRR) 4-6-0 locomotive class.

References 

G3
4-6-0 locomotives
Railway locomotives introduced in 1892
Scrapped locomotives
Standard gauge locomotives of the United States